Sheikh Khalid bin Khalifa bin Abdul Aziz Al Thani (born 1968) is a Qatari politician who has served as Prime Minister of Qatar from 28 January 2020 to 7 March 2023 and Minister of the Interior since 28 January 2020.

Qatar's amir Sheikh Tamim bin Hamad Al Thani has accepted the resignation of the country's Prime Minister, Sheikh Khaled bin Khalifa Al Thani.

The Amir has appointed Sheikh Mohammed bin Abdulrahman as Qatar's new Prime Minister.  A member of the ruling Al Thani family, he previously served as Chief of the Amiri Diwan from 2014 to 2020.

Early life and education
Sheikh Khalid was born in Doha in 1968. He went to school in Doha and then to the US where he completed his bachelor's degree in Business Administration in 1993.

Career
Sheikh Khalid worked in the Qatar Liquefied Gas Company Limited until 2002. He then worked at the office of the First Deputy Prime Minister and the Minister of Foreign Affairs from 2002 to 2006. In March 2006, Sheikh Khalid joined the Amiri Diwan. On 11 July 2006, he was appointed as director of the office of the Private Secretary of the heir apparent Sheikh Tamim bin Hamad Al Thani. On 9 January 2007, he was appointed director of the Office of Sheikh Tamim. Before becoming prime minister, he served as chief of the Amiri Diwan from 11 November 2014 to 27 January 2020.

On 28 January 2020, he was appointed Prime Minister following Sheikh Abdullah bin Nasser al-Thani's resignation.

References

Living people
1968 births
Prime Ministers of Qatar
Date of birth missing (living people)
People from Doha
21st-century Qatari politicians